A general election was held in the U.S. state of Nevada on November 3, 2020. To vote by mail, registered Nevada voters must ensure each ballot is postmarked by November 3 and received by November 10, 2020.

Federal offices

President of the United States

Incumbent Republican President Donald Trump was challenged by Democratic nominee Joe Biden in 2020. Prior to election day, news outlets and polls predicted Nevada to have a slight lean towards Biden. Nevada has six electoral votes in the Electoral College.

U.S. House of Representatives

Nevada has four congressional districts that elect four delegates to the U.S. House of Representatives. Since the 2016 elections, three representatives have been Democratic.

State offices

State Senate

10 of the 21 seats of the Nevada Senate were up for election. Democrats have retained a majority control of the senate since 2017.

State Assembly

All 42 seats of the Nevada Assembly were up for election. Democrats have retained a majority control of the assembly since 2017.

Ballot Initiatives
On the ballot were five statewide questions for Nevada Constitution amendments. The first one appears to be rejected while the four other questions are approved.

Question 2 repeals the struck-down same-sex marriage ban, replacing it with a gender-neutral formulation.

State Question 1
 "Remove provisions governing the election and duties of the Board of Regents and its control and management of the affairs and funds of the State University and require the Legislature to provide by law for the governance, control, and management of the State University."
 "Require the Legislature to provide by law for the reasonable protection of individual academic freedom for students, employees, and contractors of Nevada’s public higher education institutions."
 "Revise provisions governing the administration of certain funding derived under federal law and dedicated for the benefit of certain departments of the State University."

State Question 2
 "Remove an existing provision that only a marriage between a male person and a female person may be recognized and given effect in Nevada."
 "Require that the State of Nevada and its political subdivisions must recognize marriages of and issue marriage licenses to couples regardless of gender, and that all legally valid marriages must be treated equally under the law."
 "Provide that religious organizations and members of the clergy have the right to refuse to perform a marriage, and that no person has the right to make any claim against a religious organization or member of the clergy for refusing to perform a marriage."

State Question 3
 "Require the State Board of Pardons Commissioners—whose members are the Governor, the justices of the Nevada Supreme Court, and the Nevada Attorney General—to meet at least quarterly."
 "Authorize each member of the Board to submit matters for consideration by the Board."
 "Authorize the Board to grant pardons and make other clemency decisions by a majority vote of its members without requiring the Governor to be part of the majority of the Board that votes in favor of such decisions."

State Question 4
"Guarantee specific voting rights to all qualified and registered voters in the State."

State Question 6
"Require, beginning in calendar year 2022, that all providers of electric utility services who sell electricity to retail customers for consumption in Nevada generate or acquire incrementally larger percentages of electricity from renewable energy resources so that by calendar year 2030 not less than 50 percent of the total amount of electricity sold by each provider to its retail customers in Nevada comes from renewable energy resources."

Polling
State Question 2

Notes

See also
 Elections in Nevada
 Politics of Nevada
 Political party strength in Nevada

References

External links
  (State affiliate of the U.S. League of Women Voters)
 
 
 
 

 
Nevada